Stray Blues: A Collection of B-Sides is a compilation album by Beck, released in 2000. It is a collection of B-sides that were only released in Japan. It features "Burro," a Spanish version of "Jack-Ass," and a cover of Skip Spence's "Halo of Gold."

Track listing
All songs written by Beck, except where noted.
 "Totally Confused" – 3:30
 "Halo of Gold" (Skip Spence) – 4:29
 "Burro" – 3:13
 "Brother" – 4:48
 "Lemonade" – 2:24
 "Electric Music and the Summer People" – 3:35
 "Clock" (Beck, John King, Michael Simpson) – 3:19
 "Feather in Your Cap" – 3:45

References

Beck albums
B-side compilation albums
2000 compilation albums